Maskell or Maskel may refer to:

People
 Richard Maskel (born 1954), American curler
 Arthur Maskell (1894–1970), Australian rules footballer
 Bob Maskell, Canadian teacher and politician
 Craig Maskell (born 1968), English football player
 Dan Maskell (1908-1992), English tennis player
 Duncan Maskell (born 1961), British biochemist and academic
 Edna Maskell (born 1928), Northern Rhodesian athlete
 Harold Maskell (1911–1972), Australian rules footballer
 Joseph Maskell (1939–2001), American Catholic priest
 Les Maskell (1917-1988), Australian rules footballer
 Michael Maskell (born 1966), Barbadian olympian
 Michael Maskell (footballer) (born 1952), English football player
 Neil Maskell (born 1976), English actor 
 Rachael Maskell (born 1972), British MP
 Rosalind Maskell (1928–2016), English microbiologist
 Virginia Maskell (1936–1968), English actress
 William Miles Maskell (1839–1898), New Zealand farmer

Places
Maskell, Nebraska, United States